The taxonomy of the Gastropoda as it was revised in December 2017 by Philippe Bouchet and eight other authors, is a publication which lays out a newly revised system for the scientific classification of gastropod mollusks. The same work also included the taxonomy of monoplacophorans.

The publication is entitled, "Revised Classification, Nomenclator and Typification of Gastropod and Monoplacophoran Families"; it was published by the journal Malacologia.

Summary of the taxonomy
The following cladogram shows a summary of the new gastropod taxonomy, according to the work's Contents section:

†Paleozoic molluscs of uncertain position within Gastropoda or Monoplacophora
(Unassigned to Superfamily)
 †Family Khairkhaniidae Missarzhevsky, 1989
 †Family Ladamarekiidae Frýda, 1998
 †Family Metoptomatidae Wenz, 1938
 †Family Protoconchoididae Geyer, 1994 (=Patelliconidae Fryda, 1998)
†Superfamily Archinacelloidea Knight, 1952
 †Family Archinacellidae Knight, 1952
 †Family Archaeopragidae Horný, 1963

†Subclass Amphigastropoda

†Order Bellerophontida
†Superfamily Bellerophontoidea McCoy, 1852
 †Family Bellerophontidae McCoy, 1852
 †Subfamily Bellerophontinae McCoy, 1852 (=Liljevallospiridae Golikov & Starobogatov, 1989)
 †Subfamily Bucanopsinae Wahlman, 1992
 †Subfamily Cymbulariinae Horný, 1963
 †Subfamily Bellerophontinae Knight, 1956
 †Family Bucanellidae Koken, 1925
 †Family Bucaniidae Ulrich & Scofield, 1897
 †Subfamily Bucaniinae Knight, 1956 (=Grandostomatinae Horný, 1962)
 †Subfamily Plectonotinae Boucot & Yochelson, 1966
 †Tribe Plectonotini Boucot & Yochelson, 1966
 †Tribe Boucotonotini Frýda, 1999
 †Subfamily Salpingostomatinae Koken, 1925
 †Subfamily Undulabucaniinae Wahlman, 1992
 †Family Euphemitidae Knight, 1956
 †Subfamily Euphemitinae Knight, 1956
 †Subfamily Paleuphemitinae Frýda, 1999
 †Family Pterothecidae P. Fischer, 1883
 †Subfamily Pterothecinae P. Fischer, 1883
 †Subfamily Carinaropsinae Ulrich & Scofield, 1897
 †Subfamily Pedasiolinae Wahlman, 1992
 †Family Sinuitidae Dall, 1913
 †Subfamily Sinuitinae Dall, 1913 (=Protowarthiidae Ulrich & Scofield, 1897)
 †Subfamily Aiptospirinae Wang, 1980
 †Subfamily Hispanosinuitinae Frýda & Gutierrez-Marco, 1996
 †Family Tremanotidae Naef, 1911
 †Family Tropidodiscidae Knight, 1956 (=Temnodiscinae Horný, 1963)

†Subclass Archaeobranchia

†Order Pelagiellida
†Superfamily Pelagielloidea Knight, 1956 (=Orthostrophina)
 †Family Pelagiellidae Knight, 1956 (=Proeccyliopteridae Kobayashi, 1962; =Protoscaevogyridae Kobayashi, 1962)
 †Family Aldanellidae Linsley & Kier, 1984

†Order Helcionellida
†Superfamily Scenelloidea S. A. Miller, 1889
 †Family Scenellidae S. A. Miller, 1889
 †Subfamily Scenellinae S. A. Miller, 1889 (=Palaeacmaeidae Grabau & Shimer, 1909; =Hampilininae Kobayashi, 1958; =Eosoconidae Yu, 1979; =Merismoconchidae Yu, 1979; =Shelbyoceratidae Stinchcomb, 1986; =Actinoconidae Starobogatov & Moskalev, 1987; =Yangtzemerismatinae Yu, 1987; =Marocellidae Topper, Brock, Skovsted & Paterson, 2009)
 †Subfamily Yangtzeconinae Yu, 1979 (=Ceratoconidae Missarzhevsky, 1989)
 †Family Coreospiridae Knight, 1947 (=Archaeospiridae Yu, 1979; =Yangtzespirinae Yu, 1984; =Latouchellidae Golikov & Starobogatov, 1989)
 †Family Carinopeltidae Parkhaev, 2013 (=Igarkiellidae Parkhaev, 2001)
†Superfamily Yochelcionelloidea Runnegar & Jell, 1976
 †Family Yochelcionellidae Runnegar & Jell, 1976 (=Enigmaconidae MacKinnon, 1985)
 †Family Stenothecidae Runnegar & Jell, 1980
 †Subfamily Stenothecinae Runnegar & Jell, 1980 (=Mellopegmidae Parkhaev, 2001)
 †Subfamily Watsonellinae Parkhaev, 2001
 †Family Securiconidae Missarzhevsky, 1989 (=Rugaeconidae Vassiljeva, 1990; =Trenellidae Parkhaev, 2001)

†Paleozoic basal taxa that are certainly Gastropoda
(Unassigned to Superfamily)
 †Family Codonocheilidae S. A. Miller, 1889
 †Family Craspedostomatidae Wenz, 1938
 †Subfamily Craspedostomatinae Wenz, 1938
 †Subfamily Bucanospirinae Wenz, 1938
 †Family Crassimarginatidae Frýda, Blodgett & Lenz, 2002
 †Family Discohelicidae Schröder, 1995
 †Family Isospiridae Wangberg-Eriksson, 1964
 †Family Yuopisthonematidae Nützel, 2017 (=Opisthonematidae Yu, 1976)
 †Family Paraturbinidae Cossmann, 1916
 †Family Pragoserpulinidae Frýda, 1998
 †Family Raphistomatidae Koken, 1896 (=Ceratopeidae Yochelson & Bridge, 1957)
 †Family Rhytidopilidae Starobogatov, 1976
 †Family Scoliostomatidae Frýda, Blodgett & Lenz, 2002
 †Subfamily Scoliostomatinae Frýda, Blodgett & Lenz, 2002
 †Subfamily Mitchelliinae Frýda, Blodgett & Lenz, 2002
 †Family Sinuopeidae Wenz, 1938
 †Subfamily Sinuopeinae Wenz, 1938
 †Subfamily Platyschismatinae Knight, 1956
 †Subfamily Turbonellininae Knight, 1956
†Superfamily Clisospiroidea S. A. Miller, 1889 (=Mimospirina)
 †Family Clisospiridae S. A. Miller, 1889
 †Subfamily Clisospirinae S. A. Miller, 1889
 †Subfamily Atracurinae Horný, 1964
 †Subfamily Progalerinae Knight, 1956
 †Subfamily Trochoclisinae Horný, 1964
 †Family Onychochilidae Koken, 1925
 †Subfamily Onychochilinae Koken, 1925
 †Subfamily Hyperstropheminae Horný, 1964
 †Subfamily Scaevogyrinae Wenz, 1938
†Superfamily Euomphaloidea White, 1877
 †Family Euomphalidae White, 1877
 †Subfamily Euomphalinae White, 1877 (=Schizostomatidae Bronn, 1849; =Polytropidae Ulrich, 1897; =Straparolinae Cossmann, 1916; =Poleumitidae Wenz, 1938)
 †Subfamily Odontomariinae Frýda, Heidelberger & Blodgett, 2006
 †Family Euomphalopteridae Koken, 1896
 †Subfamily Euomphalopterinae Koken, 1896
 †Subfamily Spinicharybdiinae Rohr, Blodgett & Frýda, 2008
 †Family Helicotomidae Wenz, 1938
 †Family Lesueurillidae P. J. Wagner, 2002
 †Family Omphalocirridae Wenz, 1938
 †Family Omphalotrochidae Knight, 1945
 †Family Straparollinidae P. J. Wagner, 2002
†Superfamily Loxonematoidea Koken, 1889
 †Family Loxonematidae Koken, 1889 (=Holopellidae Koken, 1896; =Omospirinae Wenz, 1938)
 †Family Palaeozygopleuridae Horný, 1955
†Superfamily Macluritoidea Carpenter, 1861
 †Family Macluritidae Carpenter, 1861
†Superfamily Ophiletoidea Koken, 1907
 †Family Ophiletidae Koken, 1907 (=Ecculiomphalinae Wenz, 1938)
†Superfamily Oriostomatoidea Koken, 1896
 †Family Oriostomatidae Koken, 1896
 †Family Tubinidae Knight, 1956
†Superfamily Palaeotrochoidea† Knight, 1956
 †Family Palaeotrochidae Knight, 1956
†Superfamily Trochonematoidea Zittel, 1895
 †Family Trochonematidae Zittel, 1895
 †Family Lophospiridae Wenz, 1938 (=Gyronematinae Knight, 1956; =Ruedemaniinae Knight, 1956)

Subclass Patellogastropoda

Order Patellida

Superfamily Eoacmaeoidea Nakano & Ozawa, 2007
 Family Eoacmaeidae Nakano & Ozawa, 2007
Superfamily Patelloidea Rafinesque, 1815
 Family Patellidae Rafinesque, 1815
Superfamily Lottioidea Gray, 1840
 Family Lottiidae Gray, 1840
 Subfamily Lottiinae Gray, 1840
 Tribe Lottiini Gray, 1840
 Tribe Patelloidini Chapman & Gabriel, 1923
 Subfamily Tecturinae Gray, 1847
 Family Acmaeidae Forbes, 1850 (=Rhodopetalinae Lindberg, 1981; =Erginini Lindberg, 1990)
 †Family Damilinidae Horný, 1961
 Family Lepetidae Gray, 1850
 Subfamily Lepetinae Gray, 1850
 Subfamily Propilidiinae Thiele, 1891
 †Family Lepetopsidae McLean, 1990
 Family Nacellidae Thiele, 1891 (=Bertiniidae Jousseaume, 1883)
 Family Neolepetopsidae McLean, 1990
 Family Pectinodontidae Pilsbry, 1891

Subclass Neomphaliones

Order Neomphalida

Superfamily Neomphaloidea McLean, 1981
 Family Neomphalidae McLean, 1981 (=Cyathermiidae McLean, 1990)
 Family Melanodrymiidae Salvini-Plawen & Steiner, 1995
 Family Peltospiridae McLean, 1989

Order Cocculinida
Superfamily Cocculinoidea Dall, 1882
 Family Cocculinidae Dall, 1882
 Family Bathysciadiidae Dautzenberg & H. Fischer, 1900 (=Bathypeltidae Moskalev, 1971)

Subclass Vetigastropoda

†Paleozoic taxa of uncertain position
 †Family Holopeidae Cossmann, 1908
 †Family Micromphalidae J. A. Harper, 2016

Order Pleurotomariida

†Superfamily Eotomarioidea Wenz, 1938
 †Family Eotomariidae Wenz, 1938
 †Subfamily Eotomariinae Wenz, 1938 (=Liospirinae Knight, 1956)
 †Tribe Eotomariini Wenz, 1938
 †Tribe Deseretospirini Gordon & Yochelson, 1987
 †Tribe Glabrocingulini Gordon & Yochelson, 1987
 †Subfamily Neilsoniinae Knight, 1956
 †Tribe Neilsoniini Knight, 1956
 †Tribe Spirovallini Waterhouse, 2001
 †Family Gosseletinidae Wenz, 1938
 †Subfamily Gosseletininae Wenz, 1938
 †Subfamily Coelozoninae Knight, 1956
 †Tribe Coelozonini Knight, 1956 (=Euryzoninae P. J. Wagner, 2002)
 †Tribe Planozonini Knight, 1956
 †Subfamily Triangulariinae Vostokova, 1960
 †Family Luciellidae Knight, 1956
 †Family Phanerotrematidae Knight, 1956
 †Family Pseudoschizogoniidae Bandel, 2009
 †Family Wortheniellidae Bandel, 2009
†Superfamily Murchisonioidea Koken, 1896
 †Family Murchisoniidae Koken, 1896
 †Subfamily Murchisoniinae Koken, 1896 (=Hormotomidae Wenz, 1938)
 †Subfamily Cheeneetnukiinae Blodgett & Cook, 2002
 †Family Farewelliidae Mazaev, 2011
 †Family Plethospiridae Wenz, 1938 (=Pithodeinae Wenz, 1938)
 †Family Ptychocaulidae Mazaev, 2011
Superfamily Pleurotomarioidea Swainson, 1840
 Family Pleurotomariidae Swainson, 1840
 †Family Catantostomatidae Wenz, 1938
 †Family Lancedelliidae Bandel, 2009
 †Family Phymatopleuridae Batten, 1956
 †Family Polytremariidae Wenz, 1938
 †Family Portlockiellidae Batten, 1956
 †Family Rhaphischismatidae Knight, 1956
 †Family Stuorellidae Bandel, 2009
 †Family Trochotomidae Cox, 1960 (1934) (=Ditremariinae Haber, 1934)
 †Family Zygitidae Cox, 1960
†Superfamily Porcellioidea Koken, 1895
 †Family Porcelliidae Koken, 1895
 †Subfamily Porcelliinae Koken, 1895
 †Subfamily Agnesiinae Knight, 1956
 †Tribe Agnesiini Knight, 1956
 †Tribe Anoriostomatini Frýda & Farrell, 2005
 †Family Cirridae Cossmann, 1916
 †Subfamily Cirrinae Cossmann, 1916
 †Subfamily Platyacrinae Wenz, 1938 (=Hesperocirrinae O. Haas, 1953)
 †Subfamily Cassianocirrinae Bandel, 1993
 †Family Pavlodiscidae Frýda, 1998
†Superfamily Pseudophoroidea S. A. Miller, 1889
 †Family Planitrochidae Knight, 1956
 †Family Pseudophoridae S. A. Miller, 1889 (=Palaeonustidae Wenz, 1938)
†Superfamily Ptychomphaloidea Wenz, 1938
 †Family Ptychomphalidae Wenz, 1938 (=Ptychomphalinini Wenz, 1938; =Mourloniini Yochelson & Dutro, 1960)
 †Family Rhaphistomellidae Bandel, 2009
†Superfamily Schizogonioidea Cox, 1960
 †Family Schizogoniidae Cox, 1960
 †Family Pseudowortheniellidae Bandel, 2009
†Superfamily Sinuspiroidea Mazaev, 2011
 †Family Sinuspiridae Mazaev, 2011

Order Seguenziida
Superfamily Seguenzioidea Verrill, 1884
 Family Seguenziidae Verrill, 1884
 Subfamily Seguenziinae Verrill, 1884
 Tribe Seguenziini Verrill, 1884
 Tribe Fluxinellini B. A.Marshall, 1991 (=Ancistrobasidae Bandel, 2010)
 Subfamily Asthelysinae B. A.Marshall, 1991
 Subfamily Davisianinae Egorova, 1972 (=Putillinae F. Nordsieck, 1972; =Oligomeriinae Egorov, 2000)
 Subfamily Guttulinae Goryachev, 1987
 Family Cataegidae McLean & Quinn, 1987
 Family Chilodontaidae Wenz, 1938
 Family Choristellidae Bouchet & Warén, 1979
 Family Eucyclidae Koken, 1896 (=Amberleyidae Wenz, 1938; =Calliotropini Hickman & McLean, 1990; =Turcicidae Bandel, 2010)
 †Family Eucycloscalidae Gründel, 2007
 Family Eudaroniidae Gründel, 2007
 †Family Eunemopsidae Bandel, 2010
 †Family Lanascalidae Bandel, 1992
 †Family Laubellidae Cox, 1960
 Family Pendromidae Warén, 1991
 †Family Pseudoturcicidae Bandel, 2010
 †Family Sabrinellidae Bandel, 2010
 Family Trochaclididae Thiele, 1928 (=Acremodontinae B. A. Marshall, 1983)

Order Lepetellida
Superfamily Lepetelloidea Dall, 1882
 Family Lepetellidae Dall, 1882
 Family Addisoniidae Dall, 1882
 Subfamily Addisoniinae Dall, 1882
 Subfamily Helicopeltinae B. A. Marshall, 1996
 Family Bathyphytophilidae B. A. Marshall, 1986
 Family Caymanabyssiidae Moskalev, 1978
 Family Cocculinellidae Moskalev, 1971
 Family Osteopeltidae B. A. Marshall, 1987
 Family Pseudococculinidae Hickman, 1983
 Family Pyropeltidae McLean & Haszprunar, 1987
Superfamily Fissurelloidea Fleming, 1822
 Family Fissurellidae Fleming, 1822
 Subfamily Fissurellinae Fleming, 1822
 Subfamily Diodorinae Odhner, 1932
 Subfamily Emarginulinae Children, 1834 (=Rimulidae Anton, 1838; =Fissurellideini Pilsbry, 1890; =Zeidoridae Naef, 1911; =Scutini Christiaens, 1973; =Clypidinidae Golikov & Starobogatov, 1989
 Subfamily Hemitominae Kuroda, Habe & Oyama, 1971
Superfamily Haliotoidea Rafinesque, 1815
 Family Haliotidae Rafinesque, 1815 (=Deridobranchinae Gray, 1847
 †Family Temnotropidae Cox, 1960
Superfamily Lepetodriloidea McLean, 1988
 Family Lepetodrilidae McLean, 1988 (=Gorgoleptidae McLean, 1988; =Clypeosectidae McLean, 1989)
 Family Sutilizonidae McLean, 1989 (=Temnocinclinae McLean, 1989)
Superfamily Scissurelloidea Gray, 1847
 Family Scissurellidae Gray, 1847 (=Depressizoninae Geiger, 2003)
 Family Anatomidae McLean, 1989 (=Schizotrochidae Iredale & McMichael, 1962)
 Family Larocheidae Finlay, 1927

Order Trochida
Superfamily Trochoidea Rafinesque, 1815
 Family Trochidae Rafinesque, 1815
 Subfamily Trochinae Rafinesque, 1815 (=Pyramidinae Gray, 1847)
 Subfamily Alcyninae Williams, Donald, Spencer & Nakano, 2010
 Subfamily Cantharidinae Gray, 1857 (=Pagodatrochidae Bandel, 2010)
 Subfamily Chrysostomatinae Williams, Donald, Spencer & Nakano, 2010
 Subfamily Fossarininae Bandel, 2009
 Subfamily Halistylinae Keen, 1958
 Subfamily Kaiparathininae B. A. Marshall, 1993
 Subfamily Monodontinae Gray, 1857
 Subfamily Stomatellinae Gray, 1840 (=Stomatiidae Carpenter, 1861)
 Subfamily Umboniinae H. Adams & A. Adams, 1854 (1840) (=Rotellinae Swainson, 1840; =Talopiidae Finlay, 1928; =Bankiviini Hickman & McLean, 1990; =Lirulariinae Hickman & McLean, 1990; =Monileini Hickman & McLean, 1990; =Isandini Hickman, 2003)
 Family Angariidae Gray, 1857 (=Delphinulinae Stoliczka, 1868)
 †Family Anomphalidae Wenz, 1938
 †Family Araeonematidae Nützel, 2012
 Family Areneidae McLean, 2012
 Family Calliostomatidae Thiele, 1924 (1847)
 Subfamily Calliostomatinae Thiele, 1924 (1847) (=Ziziphininae Gray, 1847)
 †Subfamily Callotrochinae Szabó, 2011
 Subfamily Fautricinae B. A. Marshall, 1995
 Subfamily Margarellinae Williams, 2013
 Subfamily Thysanodontinae B. A. Marshall, 1988
 Subfamily Xeniostomatinae McLean, 2012
 Family Colloniidae Cossmann, 1917
 Subfamily Colloniinae Cossmann, 1917 (=Bothropomatinae Thiele, 1924; =Homalopomatinae Keen, 1960)
 †Subfamily Crossostomatinae Cox, 1960
 †Tribe Tadeorbisinini Monari, Conti & Szabó, 1995
 †Tribe Costataphrini Gründel, 2008
 †Tribe Crossostomatini Cox, 1960
 †Tribe Helicocryptini Cox, 1960
 †Subfamily Lewisiellinae Gründel, 2008
 Subfamily Liotipomatinae McLean, 2012
 Subfamily Moelleriinae Hickman & McLean, 1990
 †Subfamily Petropomatinae Cox, 1960
 Family Conradiidae Golikov & Starobogatov, 1987 (=Crosseolidae Hickman, 2013)
 †Family Nododelphinulidae Cox, 1960
 †Family Elasmonematidae Knight, 1956
 †Family Epulotrochidae Gründel, Keupp & Lang, 2017
 †Family Eucochlidae Bandel, 2002
 Family Liotiidae Gray, 1850
 Subfamily Liotiinae Gray, 1850 (=Cyclostrematidae P. Fischer, 1885)
 †Subfamily Brochidiinae Yochelson, 1956
 †Subfamily Dichostasiinae Yochelson, 1956
 Family Margaritidae Thiele, 1924 (=Margaritinae Stoliczka, 1868; =Gazidae Hickman & McLean, 1990)
 †Family Metriomphalidae Gründel, Keupp & Lang, 2017
 †Family Microdomatidae Wenz, 1938
 †Subfamily Microdomatinae Wenz, 1938
 †Subfamily Decorospirinae Blodgett & Frýda, 1999
 Family Phasianellidae Swainson, 1840
 Subfamily Phasianellinae Swainson, 1840 (=Eutropiinae Gray, 1847)
 Subfamily Gabrieloninae Hickman & McLean, 1990
 Subfamily Tricoliinae Woodring, 1928
 †Family Proconulidae Cox, 1960 (=Parataphrinae Calzada, 1989)
 †Family Sclarotrardidae Gründel, Keupp & Lang, 2017
 Family Skeneidae W. Clark, 1851 (=Delphinoideinae Thiele, 1924)
 Family Solariellidae Powell, 1951 (=Minoliinae Kuroda, Habe & Oyama, 1971)
 Family Tegulidae Kuroda, Habe & Oyama, 1971
 Family Turbinidae Rafinesque, 1815
 Subfamily Turbininae Rafinesque, 1815 (=Senectinae Swainson, 1840; =Imperatorinae Gray, 1847; =Astraliinae H. Adams & A. Adams, 1854; =Astraeinae Davies, 1935; =Bolmidae Delpey, 1941)
 †Subfamily Moreanellinae J. C. Fischer & Weber, 1997
 Subfamily Prisogastrinae Hickman & McLean, 1990
 †Family Tychobraheidae Horný, 1992
 †Family Velainellidae Vasseur, 1880

Subclass Neritimorpha

†Paleozoic taxa of uncertain position
†Superfamily Nerrhenoidea Bandel & Heidelberger, 2001
 †Family Nerrhenidae Bandel & Heidelberger, 2001
†Superfamily Platyceratoidea Hall, 1879
 †Family Platyceratidae Hall, 1879 (=Cyclonematidae P. Fischer, 1885; =Platyostomatidae S. A. Miller, 1889; =Strophostylidae Grabau & Shimer, 1909; =Palaeocapulidae Grabau, 1936)

†Order Cyrtoneritida
 †Family Orthonychiidae Bandel & Frýda, 1999
 †Family Vltaviellidae Bandel & Frýda, 1999
 †Subfamily Vltaviellinae Bandel & Frýda, 1999
 †Subfamily Krameriellinae Frýda & Heidelberger, 2003

Order Cycloneritida
Superfamily Helicinoidea
 Family Helicinidae
 Subfamily Helicininae (=Olygyridae; =Bourcierinae)
 Subfamily Ceratodiscinae
 †Subfamily Dimorphoptychiinae
 Subfamily Hendersoniinae
 Subfamily Stoastomatinae
 Subfamily Vianinae
 †Family Dawsonellidae
 †Family Deianiridae
 Family Neritiliidae
 Family Proserpinellidae (=Ceresinae)
 Family Proserpinidae (=Despoenidae)
Superfamily Hydrocenoidea
 Family Hydrocenidae (=Georissinae)
†Superfamily Naticopsoidea
 †Family Naticopsidae
 †Subfamily Naticopsinae
 †Subfamily Ampezzonaticopsinae
 †Subfamily Hologyrinae
 †Family Scalaneritinidae
 †Family Trachyspiridae
 †Family Tricolnaticopsidae
Superfamily Neritoidea
 Family Neritidae
 Subfamily Neritinae (=Neritellinae; =Protoneritidae)
 Subfamily Neritininae (=Orthopomatini; =Stenopomatini; =Septariini; =Theodoxinae)
 Subfamily Smaragdiinae
 †Subfamily Velatinae
 †Family Cortinellidae
 †Family Neridomidae
 †Family Neritariidae
 †Subfamily Neritariinae
 †Subfamily Oncochilinae
 †Subfamily Trachyneritariinae
 †Family Otostomidae
 †Family Parvulatopsidae
 Family Phenacolepadidae
 Subfamily Phenacolepadinae
 Subfamily Shinkailepadinae
 †Family Pileolidae
Superfamily Neritopsoidea
 Family Neritopsidae
 Subfamily Neritopsinae (=Titiscaniidae)
 †Subfamily Cassianopsinae
 †Subfamily Colubrellopsinae
 †Subfamily Paffrathiinae
 †Family Delphinulopsidae
 †Subfamily Delphinulopsinae
 †Subfamily Platychilininae
 †Family Fedaiellidae
 †Family Palaeonaricidae
 †Family Plagiothyridae
 †Family Pseudorthonychiidae
†Superfamily Symmetrocapuloidea
 †Family Symmetrocapulidae

Subclass Caenogastropoda

†Fossil taxa of uncertain position
Unassigned to Superfamily
 †Family Acanthonematidae
 †Family Ampezzanildidae
 †Family Coelostylinidae
 †Family Kittlidiscidae
 †Family Plicatusidae
 †Family Pragoscutulidae
 †Family Pseudomelaniidae (=Trajanellidae)
 †Family Spanionematidae
 †Family Spirostylidae
†Superfamily Dendropupoidea
 †Family Dendropupidae
 †Family Anthracopupidae
†Superfamily Peruneloidea
 †Family Perunelidae
 †Family Chuchlinidae
 †Family Imoglobidae
 †Family Sphaerodomidae
†Superfamily Subulitoidea
 †Family Subulitidae (=Macrocheilidae; =Bulimorphidae; =Fusispiridae)
 †Family Ischnoptygmatidae

Grade Architaenioglossa
Superfamily Ampullarioidea
 Family Ampullariidae
Superfamily Cyclophoroidea
 Family Cyclophoridae
 Family Aciculidae (=Acmeidae)
 Family Craspedopomatidae
 Family Diplommatinidae
 †Family Ferussinidae
 Family Maizaniidae
 Family Megalomastomatidae
 Family Neocyclotidae
 Family Pupinidae
Superfamily Viviparoidea
 Family Viviparidae
 Family Pliopholygidae

Cohort Sorbeoconcha
Unassigned to Superfamily
 †Family Brachytrematidae
 †Family Globocornidae
 †Family Prostyliferidae
†Superfamily Acteoninoidea
 †Family Acteoninidae
†Superfamily Orthonematoidea
 †Family Orthonematidae
 †Family Goniasmatidae
†Superfamily Palaeostyloidea
 †Family Palaeostylidae
†Superfamily Pseudozygopleuroidea
 †Family Pseudozygopleuridae (=Cyclozygidae; Eoptychiidae; Stephanozygidae)
 †Family Goniospiridae (=Polygyrinidae)
 †Family Pommerozygiidae
 †Family Protorculidae
 †Family Zygopleuridae
†Superfamily Soleniscoidea
 †Family Soleniscidae
 †Family Anozygidae
 †Family Meekospiridae

Subcohort Campanilimorpha
Superfamily Campaniloidea
 Family Campanilidae
 Family Ampullinidae
 †Family Diozoptyxidae
 †Family Gyrodidae
 †Family Metacerithiidae

Subcohort Cerithiimorpha
Taxa of uncertain position

Subcohort Hypsogastropoda

"Rissoiform clade"

Superorder Latrogastropoda

Taxa of uncertain position

Order Neogastropoda

Subclass Heterobranchia

†Fossil taxa of uncertain position

Grade "Lower Heterobranchia"

Infraclass Euthyneura

Taxa of uncertain position

Cohort Acteonimorpha

Cohort Ringipleura

Subcohort Ringiculimorpha

Order Ringiculida

Subcohort Nudipleura

Order Pleurobranchida

Order Nudibranchia
Suborder Doridina
 Infraorder Bathydoridoidei
 Infraorder Doridoidei
Suborder Cladobranchia

Cohort Tectipleura

Subcohort Euopisthobranchia

Order Umbraculida

Order Cephalaspidea

Order Runcinida

Order Aplysiida (Anaspidea)

Order Pteropoda
Suborder Euthecosomata
Suborder Pseudothecosomata
Suborder Gymnosomata

Subcohort Panpulmonata

Superorder Sacoglossa

Superorder Siphonarimorpha

Superorder Pylopulmonata

Superorder Acochlidimorpha

Superorder Hygrophila

Superorder Eupulmonata

See also
 Taxonomy of the Gastropoda (Bouchet & Rocroi, 2005)
 Changes in the taxonomy of gastropods since 2005

References

Gastropod taxonomy
Systems of animal taxonomy
Malacological literature